Manolo Fábregas (15 July 1921 – 4 February 1996) was a Spanish-born Mexican film actor. He was from an established acting family. His grandmother was Virginia Fábregas while his mother was Fanny Schiller, with whom he appeared in the western film The Tiger of Jalisco in 1947.

Filmography

References

Bibliography
 Mora, Carl J. Mexican Cinema: Reflections of a Society, 1896-2004. McFarland, 2005.

External links

 

1921 births
1996 deaths
Mexican male film actors
Spanish male film actors
People from Vigo
Spanish emigrants to Mexico